David Libokomedo Agir (12 July 1942 – 6 September 2003) was a Nauruan politician.

Political role

Standing for Aiwo Constituency, Agir was elected to the Parliament of Nauru in a by-election following Kinza Clodumar's resignation in 1979. 

Four years later Agir lost his seat again to Clodumar.

Later life

In his later years Agir worked for the Department for Island Development and Industries.

See also

 Politics of Nauru
 Elections in Nauru

Members of the Parliament of Nauru
1942 births
2003 deaths
People from Aiwo District
20th-century Nauruan politicians